The Men's United States Squash Open 2016 is the men's edition of the 2016 United States Open (squash), which is a PSA World Series event (prize money: $150,000). The event took place at the Daskalakis Athletic Center in Philadelphia, Pennsylvania in the United States from the 8th of October to the 15th October. Mohamed El Shorbagy won his second US Open trophy, beating Nick Matthew in the final.

Prize money and ranking points
For 2016, the prize purse was $150,000. The on-site prize money and points breakdown was as follows:

Seeds

Draw and results

See also
United States Open (squash)
2016–17 PSA World Series
Women's United States Open (squash) 2016

References

External links
PSA US Open 2016 website
US Squash Open official website

Squash tournaments in the United States
Men's US Open
Men's US Open
Squash in Pennsylvania